Gällivare Lapland Court District was a district of Lapland in Sweden. The provinces in Norrland were never divided into hundreds and instead the court district (tingslag) served as the basic division of rural areas.

See also
Gällivare Municipality

Subdivisions of Sweden